Lee's Summit Municipal Airport  is a public use airport in Jackson County, Missouri, United States. It is owned by the City of Lee's Summit and is located three nautical miles (6 km) north of its central business district. This facility is included in the National Plan of Integrated Airport Systems, which categorized it as a general aviation reliever airport.

Although many U.S. airports use the same three-letter location identifier for the FAA and IATA, this airport is assigned LXT by the FAA but has no designation from the IATA.

Facilities and aircraft 
Lee's Summit Municipal Airport covers an area of 433 acres (175 ha) at an elevation of 1,004 feet (306 m) above mean sea level. It has two runways with concrete surfaces: 18/36 is 5,501 by 100 feet (1,677 x 23 m) and 11/29 is 4,000 by 75 feet (1,158 x 23 m).

For the 12-month period ending December 31, 2011, the airport had 50,543 aircraft operations, an average of 138 per day: 96% general aviation, 3% air taxi, and 1% military. At that time there were 139 aircraft based at this airport: 89% single-engine, 9% multi-engine, 1% jet, and 1% helicopter.

See also 
 List of airports in Missouri

References

External links 
 Airport page at City of Lee's Summit website
  at Missouri DOT Airport Directory
 Aerial photo as of February 1996 from USGS The National Map
 
 
 

Airports in Missouri
Transportation in Jackson County, Missouri
Buildings and structures in Jackson County, Missouri
Lee's Summit, Missouri